This is a current list of ambassadors of Armenia accredited to other countries, including those having dual accreditation (ambassadors-at-large) and ambassadors accredited directly from Yerevan.

List of representatives

See also

 List of diplomatic missions in Armenia
 List of diplomatic missions of Armenia
 List of ambassadors of Armenia to China
 Foreign relations of Armenia

Sources

 
 
Armenia